The Greensboro Public School is an historic school building which is located in Greensboro in Greene County, Pennsylvania.

It was added to National Register of Historic Places on March 9, 1995.

History and architectural features
This two-and-one-half-story, seven-bay school was built in 1904 by James Parreco in the Richardsonian Romanesque style.

Students in grades one through eight attended the school until roughly 1960, when the building was donated by the school district to the town. By 1976, the building was turned over to the MONON Center to be used as a local history museum and community center that focused on regional craft and art.

It was added to National Register of Historic Places on March 9, 1995. A log cabin the Baltzer Kramer House was moved to the property sometime around 1976, but is not included in the historical site.

References 

Buildings and structures in Greene County, Pennsylvania
National Register of Historic Places in Greene County, Pennsylvania
Romanesque Revival architecture in Pennsylvania
School buildings completed in 1904
School buildings on the National Register of Historic Places in Pennsylvania
1904 establishments in Pennsylvania